Working For A Nuclear Free City is the debut album by Manchester (United Kingdom) indie band Working for a Nuclear Free City. The album was not released in the United States but all its tracks were included on their next release, the double album Businessmen & Ghosts. Their song "Dead Fingers Talking" was used in the first episode of the show Breaking Bad.

Track listing
All songs written by Phil Kay, Gary McClure, Ed Hulme, Jon Kay.

"The 224th Day" - 1:34
"Troubled Son" - 2:45
"Dead Fingers Talking" - 3:38
"Pixelated Birds" - 1:39
"Quiet Place" - 4:39
"The Tape" - 3:17
"England" - 1:09
"Over" - 3:44
"So" - 4:09
"Innocence" - 4:12
"Home" - 1:32
"Fallout" - 1:53
"Forever" - 4:37
"The Tree" - 2:33

References

2006 albums
Working for a Nuclear Free City albums